Rooster's Brewing Co. is a brewery in Harrogate, North Yorkshire, England. The Rooster's brewery was established by Sean and Alison Franklin in 1993. In 2011, the Franklins sold the brewery to Ian Fozard and his sons Tom and Oliver. Rooster's remains a family-owned brewery.

The brewery produces a range of cask-conditioned beers, currently only available on draught.

Regular Ales 

Yankee, 4.3%
YPA (Yorkshire Pale Ale), 4.3%
World Beer Cup 2006, Seattle: Gold Medal Winner. Summer Ale Category.
World Beer Cup 2008, San Diego Gold Medal Winner. Summer Ale Category
World Beer Cup 2010, Chicago: Silver Medal Winner. Summer Ale Category

Leghorn, 4.3%
Brewing Industry International Awards 2005, Munich: Gold Medal Winner. Summer Ale Category
World Beer Cup 2010, Chicago: Gold Medal Winner. Summer Ale Category

Wrangler 3.7%
Wild Mule, 3.9%

Outlaw Brewing Co 
The Outlaw Brewing Co is a subsidiary label of Rooster's Brewery. Under this name, the company makes experimental and seasonal beers.

References

External links
Official website of Rooster's Brewery

Breweries in Yorkshire
Companies established in 1993
Knaresborough
Companies based in the Borough of Harrogate
British companies established in 1993
Food and drink companies established in 1993